The 2022–23 South Carolina State Bulldogs basketball team represented South Carolina State University in the 2022–23 NCAA Division I men's basketball season. The Bulldogs, led by first-year head coach Erik Martin, played their home games at SHM Memorial Center in Orangeburg, South Carolina as members of the Mid-Eastern Athletic Conference.

Previous season
The Bulldogs finished the 2021–22 season 15–16, 7–7 in MEAC play to finish in fifth place. As the No. 5 seed, they were defeated by No. 4 seed Morgan State in the quarterfinals of the MEAC tournament.

On April 11, after just one year as head coach, Tony Madlock left the program to take the same position at Alabama State. On July 13, the school introduced longtime West Virginia assistant coach Erik Martin as the Bulldogs' next head coach.

Roster

Schedule and results

|-
!colspan=12 style=| Exhibition

|-
!colspan=12 style=| Non-conference regular season

|-
!colspan=12 style=| MEAC regular season

|-
!colspan=9 style=| MEAC tournament

Sources

References

South Carolina State Bulldogs basketball seasons
South Carolina State Bulldogs
South Carolina State Bulldogs basketball
South Carolina State Bulldogs basketball